Track & Signal is a railroad-related periodical published in Australia.  It covers the railroad operations and equipment industries.

Track & Signal was established in October 1996 and the first issue was the January–March 1997 issue. The magazine is published by the Australasian Railway Association. The headquarters is in Melbourne. The last issue was published in December 2019, before production was temporarily suspended due to the COVID-19 pandemic. As at July 2022, production had yet to resume.

See also
 List of railroad-related periodicals

References

External links
 Track & Signal

1996 establishments in Australia
Magazines established in 1996
Magazines published in Melbourne
Quarterly magazines published in Australia
Rail transport magazines published in Australia